Philip, Phil or Phill Jones may refer to:

Sports
Phil Jones (American football) (born 1946), American football coach
Phil Jones (footballer, born 1961), English footballer who played for Sheffield United in the Football League
Phil Jones (footballer, born 1992), English footballer who plays for Manchester United
Phil Jones (journalist) (active since 1990s), English sports journalist and television reporter
Phil Jones (basketball) (born 1985), Virgin Islands basketball player
Phill Jones (born 1974), New Zealand basketball player
Phil Jones (umpire) (born 1960), New Zealand cricket umpire
Phil Jones (rugby) (born 1977), English rugby league and rugby union footballer
Phillip Jones (bowls) (born 1955), Norfolk Island lawn bowler
Phillip Alonzo Jones, American football and basketball player and coach

Politicians
Philip Jones (MP) (died 1603), Welsh politician, Member of Parliament for Monmouth Boroughs
Philip Jones of Fonmon (1618–1674), Welsh colonel in the Parliamentary Army
Phil H. Jones (1874–?), American politician
Philip Asterley Jones (1914–1978), British solicitor and politician

Others
Sir Philip Sydney Jones (1836–1918), Australian medical practitioner
Philip Stuart Jones (1927–2004), radio and television producer
Philip Jones (musician) (1928–2000), British trumpeter and brass chamber music ensemble leader
Sir Philip Jones (civil servant) (1931–2000), Welsh businessman and civil servant
Philip Jones (priest) (born 1951), Archdeacon of Lewes & Hastings
Phil Jones (climatologist) (born 1952), British climatologist
Philip Jones (Royal Navy officer) (born 1960), British admiral and First Sea Lord
Philip Jones (historian), British medieval historian
Philip Jones, Australian anthropologist, historian, author, curator of the South Australian Museum

See also 
Philip Madoc (born Phillip Jones, 1934–2012), Welsh actor